The United States National Student Association (NSA) was a confederation of college and university student governments that was in operation from 1947 to 1978.

Founding and early years
The NSA was founded at a conference at the University of Wisconsin in 1947, and established its first headquarters not far from the campus in Madison. The NSA was led by officers elected at its annual National Student Congress. It later opened an office at 2115 'S' St. in Washington, D.C. William Birenbaum, later Provost at the New School and President of Antioch College, was an early leader of the NSA.

Funding by the Central Intelligence Agency 
From the early 1950s until 1967, the international program of the NSA, and some of its domestic activities, were underwritten by clandestine funding from the Central Intelligence Agency (CIA) as revealed by Ramparts magazine 

Beginning in the late 1950s, the NSA conducted an annual Southern Student Human Relations Seminar (SSHRS), educating Southern student leaders on issues relating to race and civil rights. In late 1959 the SSHRS leadership opened a year-round office in Atlanta. However, objecting to sit-ins and other direct action its August 1960 convention in Minneapolis debated a motion to deny support to the fledgling Student Non-Violent Coordinating Committee (SNCC). It was defeated following a standing ovation given to an intervention by Sandra Cason (Casey Hayden), She was recruited on the spot by Alan Haber for new, rival, campus organisation, Students for a Democratic Society, into which she was followed by other NSA delegates, including Tom Hayden, editor of the University of Michigan newspaper.

The story of the Central Intelligence Agency's secret financing of the National Student Association, which hit the front pages of the national press in March 1967, did not measurably damage the NSA's standing with student governments. But the majority of the million-plus students that NSA claimed to "represent" were likely unaware of the organization. The NSA had concentrated its recruiting efforts on persuading the on-campus student governments, typically a handful of leaders, to formally affiliate. Only in rare instances did the NSA and its campus agents go directly to the student body for a vote of approval.

In August 1967, the NSA formally cut its ties with the CIA and began, for example, paying the mortgage on its offices in Washington, DC. The organization remained in a brownstone on S Street, NW for many years until its mergers with the National Student Lobby and National Student Educational Fund.

1969–1978 
In 1969, the NSA held its annual meeting in El Paso, Texas, where thousands of student delegates overwhelmed the city, particularly the Hotel Cortez, with music, drugs, and free love. Bill M. Shamblin, former editor of the University of Alabama's newspaper, the CW, was one of the meeting's lead speakers. The NSA's Executive Vice President, James Hercules Sutton,  presented testimony that year against an all-volunteer Army to a Congressional panel that included General James Gavin and General Omar Bradley, expressing the view that such an Army would be racially imbalanced in enlisted ranks. Jim Graham, Washington D.C. City Councilman, was an NSA Vice President during this time.

In 1971, Margery Tabankin was elected the first woman president of the NSA.

NSA held annual national conferences attended by student leaders, especially student body presidents from their respective student government. It was also American host for student Euro rail and air passes, and for many years served as American students' representative to IATA, the International Air Transport Association.

For its 1973 annual convention, NSA produced a series of booklets given to all attendees, including The Student Press, Women on Campus, and Men on Campus.

In 1978 the NSA merged with the National Student Lobby (NSL), to form the United States Student Association (USSA).

The NSA originally housed the United States Student Press Association (USSPA), and its news agency, Collegiate Press Service (CPS). Both groups spun away as independent groups but eventually shut down as student-run organizations. Collegiate Press Service survives as a successful commercial publication.

See also
 Congress for Cultural Freedom
 Operation Mockingbird

Notes

References and further reading
 Wilford, Hugh. The Mighty Wurlitzer: How the CIA Played America. Cambridge: Harvard University Press, 2008.  .
 

Student political organizations in the United States
Organizations disestablished in 1978
Student organizations established in 1947
1947 establishments in Wisconsin
Student governments in the United States
Central Intelligence Agency front organizations
1978 disestablishments in the United States